The National University of Saint Anthony the Abad in Cuzco (Spanish: Universidad Nacional de San Antonio Abad del Cusco) (UNSAAC), also known as Saint Anthony University of Cusco or University of Cusco, is a public university in Cusco, Peru and one of the oldest in the country. Its foundation was first proposed on March 1, 1692, at the urging and support of Pope Innocent XII. The document in which Pope Innocent XII sponsored the founding of the university was signed in Madrid, Spain by King Charles II on June 1, 1692, thus becoming Cusco's principal and oldest university. The university was authorized to confer the bachelors, licentiate, masters, and doctorate degrees.

UNSAAC consistently ranks among the top ten universities in the country. It currently has 24 faculties with 37 professorial chairs and 29 academic departments.

Alumni
José Bustamante y Rivero - President of Peru 1945-1948
Oswaldo Baca (1908-1962) - chemist
Trinidad María Enríquez (1846–1891) 1st woman to graduate from university in Peru
Valentín Paniagua - Interim President of Peru after Alberto Fujimori resigned in November 2000

Eponyms
UNSAAC is commemorated in the scientific name of a species of lizard, Proctoporus unsaacae, which is endemic to Peru.

See also
 List of universities in Peru
 Saint Anthony the Abbot Seminary

References

External links
  (in Spanish)
 (in Spanish)

See also 
 List of colonial universities in Latin America
 List of Jesuit sites

External links
Universidad Nacional de San Antonio Abad del Cusco website
 History, Indians, and university reform in Cuzco

Universities in Peru
Educational institutions established in the 1690s
1692 establishments in the Spanish Empire